Vijaypur or Vijayapur may refer to:

 Vijayapura, Karnataka, also known as Bijapur
 Vijaypur, Uttarakhand, a hill station in Bageshwar district, Uttarakhand, India
 Vijayapur, Nepal, a historical capital now part of the Dharan town
 Vijay Pur, Jammu and Kashmir, India
 Bijeypur, or  Vijaypur, a city in the Sheopur District of Madhya Pradesh, India
 Raghogarh-Vijaypur, a town in Guna district, Madhya Pradesh, India
 Vijayapuram, a village in Andhra Pradesh, India

See also 

 Bijapur (disambiguation)